"Wonderful" is a song by Swiss singer-songwriter Luca Hänni. It was written by Eric van Tijn, Jochem Fluitsma, Joachim Vermeulen Windsant, Maarten ten Hove, Willem Laseroms, Mark van Tijn and Ramon Marco for Hänni's third studio album When We Wake Up (2015), while production was overseen by Egger. It was released on 28 August 2015 by Muve Records, serving as the album's second single. The song peaked at number 58 on the Swiss Singles Chart.

Music video
A music video to accompany the release of "Wonderful" was first released onto YouTube on 8 September 2015 at a total length of three minutes and thirty-five seconds.

Track listing

Charts

Release history

References

2015 singles
2015 songs
Luca Hänni songs
Songs written by Eric van Tijn
Songs written by Jochem Fluitsma